Chokkalingam Nagappan (born 4 October 1951) is a former judge of the Supreme Court of India who served from September 2013 till his retirement in October 2016.

Education
Nagappan hails from Karur in Tamil Nadu and had his initial schooling there. He did his pre-university course in St. Joseph's College, Tiruchirappalli and completed his B.Sc. Degree in Chemistry at Madura College, Madurai.  He studied law at Madras Law College and secured Third Rank in the Final University Examination in April, 1974.  He did his M.L. Course in Criminal Law  and secured  First Rank in 1977.

Career
He practiced as Junior Advocate under K. Parasaran, former Attorney General of India. He was a part-time Professor in Madras Law College for 7 years. He was directly recruited as District and Sessions Judge in 1987 and  worked as District and Sessions Judge at Cuddalore, Salem and Coimbatore.  Thereafter, he worked as the Special Officer, Vigilance Cell, Madras High Court. He was elevated as a Judge of The Madras High Court on 27 September 2000 and appointed a permanent Judge on 20 September 2002. He was then further elevated as the Chief Justice of the Orissa High Court and sworn in on 27 February 2013. He was appointed a Judge of The Supreme Court of India and sworn in on 19 September 2013.

Nagappan who held a relatively short tenure retired as a Judge of the Supreme Court of India on 3 October 2016.

Notable Judgements

Aadhar
A three judge bench of the Indian Supreme Court, comprising Nagappan, Jasti Chelameswar, and Sharad Arvind Bobde ratified an earlier order of the Supreme Court and clarified that no Indian citizen without an Aadhaar card can be deprived of basic services and government subsidies.

References

External links
Profile in Orissa High Court website

1951 births
Living people
Chief Justices of the Orissa High Court
Judges of the Madras High Court
Justices of the Supreme Court of India
20th-century Indian judges
21st-century Indian judges